Hamilton is a city in and the county seat of Butler County, Ohio, United States. The population was 63,399 at the 2020 census. Hamilton is governed under a council-manager form of government; the current mayor is Patrick Moeller and the city manager is Joshua Smith. Most of the city is served by the Hamilton City School District.

Hamilton has three designated National Historic Districts: Dayton Lane, German Village, and Rossville. The industrial city is seeking to revitalize through the arts; it declared itself the "City of Sculpture" in 2000. Its initiative has attracted many sculpture installations to the city, which founded the Pyramid Hill Sculpture Park.

History

Fort Hamilton
Hamilton started as Fort Hamilton (named to honor Alexander Hamilton, first Secretary of the Treasury), constructed in Sept.-Oct. 1791 by General Arthur St. Clair, governor of the Northwest Territory. The fort was the first of several built north from Fort Washington into Indian territory. The fort was built to serve as a supply station for the troops of general Arthur St. Clair during his campaign in the Northwest Indian War. Later it was used by General "Mad" Anthony Wayne. In 1792 the fort was enlarged with a stable area by General Wayne. The fort was abandoned in 1796 after the signing of the Treaty of Greenville.

A settlement grew up around the fort and was platted as Fairfield in 1794. By 1800, Hamilton was becoming an agricultural and regional trading town. The town was platted, government was seated, and the town named by 1803.

Hamilton incorporated
Hamilton was first incorporated by act of the Ohio General Assembly in 1810, but lost its status in 1815 for failure to hold elections. It was reincorporated in 1827 with Rossville, the community across the Great Miami River in St. Clair Township. The two places severed their connection in 1831 only to be rejoined in 1854. Designated the county seat, this became a city in 1857. On 14 March 1867, Hamilton withdrew from the townships of Fairfield and St. Clair to form a "paper township", but the city government is dominant.

On the afternoon of September 17, 1859, Abraham Lincoln arrived at the Hamilton Station (the station is on the city's Historic Preservation list). He gave a campaign speech in support of his fellow Republican, William Dennison, who was running for Ohio governor. Lincoln's speech concentrated on popular sovereignty. He began: "This beautiful and far-famed Miami Valley is the garden spot of the world." It was during this campaign that the relatively unknown Lincoln was first mentioned as a possible presidential contender.

Industrialization
By the mid-19th century, Hamilton had developed as a significant manufacturing city. Its early products were often machines and equipment used to process the region's farm produce, such as steam engines, hay cutters, reapers and threshers. Other production included machine tools, house hardware, saws for mills, paper, paper making machinery, carriages, guns, whiskey, beer, woolen goods, and myriad and diverse output made from metal, grain, and cloth.

By the early 20th century, the town was a heavy-manufacturing center for vaults and safes, machine tools, cans for vegetables, paper, paper making machinery, locomotives, frogs and switches for railroads, steam engines, diesel engines, foundry products, printing presses, and automobile parts. During the two world wars, its factories manufactured war materiel, Liberty ship engines, and gun lathes. Manufacturers used coke to feed furnaces. Its by-product, gas, fueled street lights. The Great Miami River valley, in which Hamilton was located, had become an industrial giant.

The county courthouse, constructed between 1885 and 1889, has been listed on the National Register of Historic Places because of its monumental architecture. The city has three historic districts: Dayton Lane, German Village and Rossville. Like Cincinnati, Hamilton attracted many German and Italian immigrants from the mid-19th century on, whose influence was expressed in culture, food and architecture. Hamilton also had a Jewish community; with increased immigration by Eastern European Jews, they founded Beth Israel Synagogue in 1901 as an Orthodox alternative to Hamilton's Reform synagogue. It had been founded by German Jews in the 1880s, when nearby Cincinnati was a center of Reform Judaism in the United States. At the time around 250 Jewish families lived in Hamilton.

In the 1920s, many Chicago gangsters established second homes in Hamilton. This gave Hamilton the nickname "Little Chicago". Some of these men appeared to have invested in what became an active district of gambling and prostitution. During World War II, the military declared the entire city off-limits to its enlisted personnel because of its numerous gambling and prostitution establishments. Madame Freeze's and the long row of prostitution houses along Wood Street (now called Pershing Avenue) were notorious among soldiers. Factories in Hamilton converted their operations to support the war effort, manufacturing military supplies, such as tank turrets, Liberty ship and submarine engines, and machined and stamped metal parts.

With the 1950s came the construction of the new interstate highway I-75, part of a nationwide system and one which bypassed the city. A decision made to reduce traffic through the city resulted in cutting it off from the newest transportation network, and businesses were drawn to areas outside with access to the highway. Until 1999, when the Butler County Veterans Highway was built, Hamilton was the second-largest city in the United States without direct interstate access.

On March 30, 1975, Easter Sunday, James Ruppert murdered 11 family members in his mother's house at 635 Minor Avenue in Hamilton, in what is referred to as the "Easter Sunday Massacre". The murders shocked the town of Hamilton and the entire country. This was the deadliest shooting inside a private residence in American history.

In the late 20th century, industrial restructuring in heavy manufacturing resulted in widespread loss of jobs in older industrial cities, as operations were merged, relocated, and finally moved offshore. Like other Rust Belt cities in the northern tier, Hamilton has struggled to develop a new economy after such wide-scale changes, but it has retained more of its population than many such cities. In addition, since the late 20th century it has attracted new immigrants, primarily Hispanics from Mexico and Latin America.

In 2009, the city won the Berkeley Springs International Water Tasting Awards for best-tasting municipal water for the United States; and in 2010, a gold medal for the best in the world.

Hamilton Hydraulic
The Hamilton Hydraulic, also called the Hamilton & Rossville Hydraulic, was a system devised to supply water power to shops and mills; it spurred one of Hamilton's greatest periods of industrial and population growth (1840–1860). Specially built canals and natural reservoirs brought water from the Great Miami River north of Hamilton into the town as a source of power for future industries.

The hydraulic began about four miles north of Hamilton on the river, where a dam was built to divert water into the system. Nearby, two reservoirs stored water for the hydraulic, whose main canal continued south along North Fifth Street to present Market Street. There it took a sharp west turn to the river at the present intersection of Market Street and North Monument Avenue, between the former Hamilton Municipal Building and the present Courtyard by Marriott. The first water passed through the system in January 1845. As the water flowed through the canal, it turned millstones in the hydraulic. The project had been a risky one because there were no shops along its course to use the power when the company was organized in 1842. The gamble paid off. Several small industries were built on the hydraulic in the 1840s. One was the Beckett Paper Co.

The hydraulic remained a principal source of power for Hamilton industries through the 1870s when stationary steam engines became practical and affordable. Later, most of the hydraulic canal was covered and/or filled. The hydraulic attracted auto manufacturer Henry Ford to Hamilton after World War I, when he sought a site for a tractor factory. Ford built a plant—which soon converted to producing auto parts—at the north end of North Fifth Street so it could take advantage of power provided by a branch of the hydraulic.

A Rossville hydraulic also was built, but never achieved the success of the Hamilton system.

1913 flood

Geographic and geological evidence shows that floods have occurred throughout the valley since prehistoric times. Since European-American settlement, diaries, anecdotes, folk tales, letters, and official records have provided documentation of relatively common severe floods in 1814, 1828, 1832, 1847, 1866, 1883, 1897, 1898, and 1907.

In March 1913, the greatest flood occurred. Heavy rain fell over the entire watershed, and the ground was frozen, as well as saturated from previous lighter rains. This resulted in a high rate of run-off from the rain: an estimated 90% flowed directly into the streams, creeks, and rivers. Between  of rain fell over five days, March 25 to March 29, 1913. An amount equivalent to about 30 days' discharge of water over Niagara Falls flowed through the Miami Valley during the ensuing flood. In the Great Miami River Valley, 360 persons died, about 200 of whom were from Hamilton. Some drowned, some were washed away and never found, others died from various diseases and complications, and some committed suicide because of severe losses. Damage in the valley was calculated at $100 million, the equivalent of $2 billion in 21st-century value. The flood waters were so powerful that within two hours they destroyed all four of Hamilton's bridges: Black Street, High-Main Street, Columbia, and the railroad bridge.

In Hamilton, the flood waters rose with unexpected and frightening suddenness, reaching over three to eight feet in depth in downtown, and up to eighteen feet in the North End, along Fifth Street and through South Hamilton Crossing. The waters spread from D Street on the west to what is now Erie Highway on the east. The waters' rise was so swift that many people were trapped in the upper floors of businesses and houses. In some cases, people had to escape to their attics, and then break through the roof as the waters rose even higher. Temperatures hovered near freezing. The water current varied, but in constricted locations it raced at more than twenty miles per hour. The dead people, more than 1,000 drowned horses, other livestock, and pets, and sewage tainted the water. Nearly one-third of the population was left homeless and displaced: 10,000 of the 35,000 residents of Hamilton. Thousands of houses were destroyed by the flood; afterward, many that were too damaged to repair had to be demolished by city workers.

Miami Conservancy District
Following the disastrous 1913 flood in the Great Miami River Valley, residents realized that the only way to prevent future flooding was to deal with protection on a watershed basis. Citizens from all the major cities in the valley, Piqua, Troy, Dayton, Carlisle, Franklin, Miamisburg, Middletown, and Hamilton, gathered together to find a solution and worked with legislative representatives to draft enabling legislation to create the Miami Conservancy District. It was passed by the state and signed into law by Governor James Cox. Although challenged several times in the courts, the laws withstood those attacks. The law and District have also withstood the tests of time. By 1915, the District hired an engineering staff, which developed plans for valley-long channel improvements, levees, and storage basins to temporarily retain excessive rains. The system was designed to withstand rains and flows that would be up to 40% greater than those of 1913. Waters have been retained more than 1,000 times, thereby preventing flooding. Construction began in 1915 and was completed in 1923. The Miami Conservancy District was the first of its kind in the nation and has been an example of flood control protection. It is unique for having been developed, built, and supported financially just by those who benefit. The Miami Conservancy District is financially supported by an assessment on each property that was affected by the 1913 waters, related to the present value of the property because it is not at risk of flooding. All the other areas within the District are assessed because they benefit by reducing or eliminating danger to infrastructure, commerce, and transportation.

Toxic waste issues

Chem-Dyne is a hazardous waste dump site located on the east side of Hamilton. In 1982, the Justice Department disclosed that the hazardous chemicals at the dump included arsenic, benzene, cyanides, vinyl chloride, naphthalene, chloroform, polychlorinated biphenyls, trichloroethylene and the pesticides aldrin and dieldrin. The Justice Department filed a lawsuit against Chem-Dyne and asked the court to issue an injunction requiring the defendants to help with cleanup as well as to reimburse the government for clearing and safeguarding the site, which the department said had already cost $826,000. The defendants were alleged to have violated the Resource Conservation and Recovery Act and the Superfund Act established to help pay for cleaning up hazardous waste sites. The Justice Department said the out-of-court settlement with the other companies had been reached after four months of negotiations that included Ohio authorities. It did not identify the companies that settled.

Renaming
On May 28, 1986, as part of a plan to increase publicity about Hamilton and aid in city revitalization, the City Council voted 5–1 in favor of adding an exclamation point to the city's name, similarly to the popular musical Oklahoma!.  Thus, Hamilton officially became Hamilton!  While at the time used extensively in the city's documents, letterheads, business cards and on local signage, the United States Board on Geographic Names did not include the exclamation point; nor did Rand McNally maps. The exclamation point is generally no longer used. It is not in use on the Hamilton municipal website.

Geography

Demographics

2020 census
As of the census of 2020, there were 63,399 people and 27,392 households residing in the city. The racial makeup of the city was 74.6% White, 9.9% African American, 0.6% Native American, 0.9% Asian, 0.4% Pacific Islander, 6.1% from other races, and 7.5% from two or more races. Hispanic or Latino of any race were 10.0% of the population.

2010 census
As of the census of 2010, there were 62,477 people, 24,658 households, and 15,489 families residing in the city. The racial makeup of the city was 84.0% White, 8.5% African American, 0.2% Native American, 0.6% Asian, 0.1% Pacific Islander, 3.6% from other races, and 2.9% from two or more races. Hispanic or Latino of any race were 6.4% of the population.

There were 24,658 households, of which 32.9% had children under the age of 18 living with them, 39.3% were married couples living together, 17.3% had a female householder with no husband present, 6.2% had a male householder with no wife present, and 37.2% were non-families. 30.6% of all households were made up of individuals, and 10.8% had someone living alone who was 65 years of age or older. The average household size was 2.47 and the average family size was 3.06.

The median age in the city was 35.3 years. 24.9% of residents were under the age of 18; 9.4% were between the ages of 18 and 24; 27.6% were from 25 to 44; 24.9% were from 45 to 64; and 13.2% were 65 years of age or older. The gender makeup of the city was 48.8% male and 51.2% female.

2000 census
As of the census of 2000, there were 60,690 people, 24,188 households, and 15,867 families residing in the city. The population density was 2,808.2 people per square mile (1,084.3/km2). There were 25,913 housing units at an average density of 1,199.0/sq mi (463.0/km2). The racial makeup of the city was 88.94% White, 7.55% African American, 0.29% Native American, 0.45% Asian, 0.04% Pacific Islander, 1.46% from other races, and 1.28% from two or more races. Hispanic or Latino of any race were 2.58% of the population.

There were 24,188 households, out of which 31.5% had children under the age of 18 living with them, 45.5% were married couples living together, 15.3% had a female householder with no husband present, and 34.4% were non-families. 29.3% of all households were made up of individuals, and 11.7% had someone living alone who was 65 years of age or older. The average household size was 2.45 and the average family size was 3.02.

In the city the population was spread out, with 25.8% under the age of 18, 9.8% from 18 to 24, 29.9% from 25 to 44, 20.2% from 45 to 64, and 14.3% who were 65 years of age or older. The median age was 35 years. For every 100 females, there were 92.6 males. For every 100 females age 18 and over, there were 89.1 males.

The median income for a household in the city was $35,365, and the median income for a family was $41,936. Males had a median income of $32,646 versus $23,850 for females. The per capita income for the city was $17,493. About 10.6% of families and 13.4% of the population were below the poverty line, including 18.1% of those under age 18 and 9.8% of those age 65 or over.

Sports
Hamilton was home to minor league baseball in 1884, 1889, 1911 and 1913, as the Hamilton Mechanics played as members of the Ohio State League.

Hamilton Joes
The Hamilton Joes (Baseball Club) is a collegiate summer baseball team that competes in the Great Lakes Summer Collegiate League (GLSCL), which is one of eight leagues formed under the National Alliance of College Summer Baseball (NACSB). (The NACSB is responsible for other high-profile leagues such as the Cape Cod Baseball League). The club was named after Cincinnati Reds baseball player and broadcaster Joe Nuxhall. The club's name is also a tribute to his legacy of giving to the community. The Joes inaugural season was in 2009. They won the GLSCL championship in 2010 and 2016. There have been 40 former Joes drafted or signed into professional baseball, most notably Brent Suter (2009, 2010) of the Milwaukee Brewers and Ryan Rua (2010) of the Texas Rangers.

Little League World Series
In 2021, they won the Tom Seaver bracket and advanced to the championship game, where they lost to a team from Taylor, Michigan. West Side Little League has also won the state championship 19 times since 1988 in the majors division.

Government
The Council consists of seven members who are elected in non-partisan elections at staggered intervals and serve four-year terms. They elect a mayor within the council, and together select and appoint a professional city manager to operate the city. Operating as the legislative branch of the city, the Council provides policy direction to the City Manager. The judge of the municipal court is also an elected official.

The city's Council-Manager form of government was established in 1926, based then on election by proportional representation with a single transferable vote (STV). This system was developed to try to meet the rapidly changing needs of cities with their growing immigrant populations. "The PR/STV ballot allows voters to rank order their choices in either at-large or multimember district elections. With each ballot ultimately counting toward the election of one candidate, voters' preferences can be transferred to second or subsequent choices if their most preferred candidate is already elected or has no chance of election, thus maximizing the proportion of effective votes and permitting minorities to win their share of seats."

Hamilton was one of several major Ohio cities that adopted the PR/STV form of elections in the early 20th century; Ashtabula was the first in 1915. This system was considered more progressive than plurality voting, with winner take all, and the at-large election system found in some cities, which also benefited the majority and generally succeeded in preventing minorities from gaining office. Use of PR/STV resulted in more minorities, including women, being able to enter politics and attain positions on city councils which they likely otherwise would not have gained in at-large voting.  Under the Voting Rights Act of 1965, a significant minority is that representing 5% or more of the population.

The success of PR/STV nationally (including in New York City for a time) led to a political backlash from bosses and parties that lost power. In Hamilton, opponents mounted numerous campaigns to repeal the charter, finally succeeding after four failed referendums in 12 years. Since the city of Hamilton returned to plurality voting, the African-American minority has less frequently been able to win seats on the council. In 2015, however, city council members include two women (white) and an African-American man; other members are white males.

The City Manager operates as chief executive officer, directing a workforce of more than 675 permanent employees and a $400+ million budget. The city also maintains a Public Safety Director for the city, responsible for police protection, staffed by more than 110 full-time professionals, and fire protection, staffed by more than 110 full-time fire fighters.

Education
Hamilton is served by the Hamilton City School District, which operates Hamilton High School. The district has underway a major $200 million capital program including construction of eight elementary schools, a freshman school, two completely renovated middle schools, and an upgraded high school with two new gyms, a new media center, six new classrooms and a new cafeteria.

In 2002, President George W. Bush visited Hamilton and signed the No Child Left Behind Act into law at Hamilton High School.

The Talawanda City School District and Talawanda High School in Oxford, Ohio serves a small portion of the city.

The Ross Local School District and Ross High School operate outside the city proper, serving a small portion of the city and surrounding rural area.

Father Stephen T. Badin High School, a private Catholic high school of the Archdiocese of Cincinnati, and several Catholic elementary schools (St. Ann Catholic School, St. Peter in Chains School, St. Joseph Consolidated School, Sacred Heart of Jesus School and Queen of Peace School), serve the city and surrounding area.

Richard Allen Schools, a charter school system, has a campus in Hamilton: Richard Allen Academy.

Miami University, based in Oxford, Ohio, has a regional campus in the city. Miami University Hamilton opened in 1968 and now has more than  5,000 students. It also has a campus in nearby Middletown, with about 2,700 students.

Infrastructure

Transportation
Highways serving Hamilton are U.S. Route 127, State Route 128,  State Route 129, State Route 130, and State Route 4.  Hamilton's location at the intersection of U.S. Route 127 and State Routes 128. 129, and 130 makes the city one of the few towns located at the intersection of four consecutively numbered highways.

Hamilton station is currently unused. It previously serviced passenger trains to Detroit (until 1971), Chicago, Washington and New York City (until 2005).

Lane Library System

The Lane Public Library is located in an architecturally significant building in the heart of Hamilton's Historic German Village. Built in 1866 by local philanthropist Robert Clark Lane, the library building has survived floods and fires and has been improved by six separate renovations and expansion projects. It is a community focal point for Hamilton.

A significant building renovation in 1995-1996 upgraded the library for the 21st century's technology while protecting its Victorian architectural character. The 25,000-square foot building houses several library administration departments as well as the Circulation, Information, Teen, and Children's Departments. It has a large local history room, which also has materials related to genealogy.

Clark donated the first collection of materials to the library, approximately 3,000 books. Today, the collection numbers over 123,000. In addition to popular books and research volumes, the library offers the community access to videos, DVDs, CDs, CD ROMs, puppets, audio books and eBooks. In the year 2000, more than 435,000 items were checked out of Clark Lane's library, and staff members answered over 48,500 reference questions.

The Lane Public Library also features the Lane Libraries Community Technology Center, located on the ground floor of the historic Robinson-Schwenn Building at 10 Journal Square in downtown Hamilton. The center offers a high-tech collaborative work/play/create space with public use computers (both PC and Mac), high-end software, tablet and eReader demo displays, 3D printers and comfortable lounge-style seating with Wi-Fi available throughout.

Notable people

 Denicos Allen, linebacker for Michigan State University
 William Allen (1827-1881), United States Congressman
 Jim Blount, newspaper editor
 Leroy "Sugarfoot" Bonner, guitarist (Ohio Players)
 Frank Clair, former Canadian Football League coach
 Ray Combs (1956-1996), comedian and second host of Family Feud
 Aaron Cook, professional baseball player
 Sheehan Donoghue, Wisconsin assemblyman
 Robert Dove, Parliamentarian of the U.S. Senate
 Greg Dulli, musician
 Byron Elliott, Justice of the Indiana Supreme Court
 Warren Gard (1873-1929), United States congressman, lawyer 
 Kevin Grevey, professional basketball player
 Ronald Hamilton, opera singer
 Jon Hoke, secondary coach for the Atlanta Falcons
 William Dean Howells, author
 Fannie Hurst, author
 Steven Ittel, organometallic chemist
 David Klarich, politician from Missouri
 Eric Lange, actor (Lost, Victorious)
 Mark Lewis, professional baseball player
 Joshua L. Liebman, rabbi
 John Martinkovic, NFL player
 Robert McCloskey (1914-2003), author and illustrator of children's books
 Patrick McCollum, nationally recognized naturalist, conservationist
 Kevin McGuff, women's college basketball coach at Ohio State University
 Steve Morse, guitarist
 William Pitt Murray, Minnesota politician and lawyer
 Pamela Myers, actress
 Jane Nelson, Texas state senator
 Joe Nuxhall, professional baseball player
 Adam Pankey, NFL Offensive Tackle
 Patricia Parris, voice actress 
 Mark Peck, New Zealand member of Parliament
 Nan Phelps, artist
 Floyd "Breezy" Reid, American football running back
 Frederick Rentschler, aircraft engine designer, aviation engineer, and industrialist
 Charles Richter, seismologist and creator of Richter scale
 Glen Edward Rogers, American serial killer
 Bonnie Rotten, pornographic actress
 James Ruppert, mass murderer
 Paul Sarringhaus, NFL player
 David Shaw, musician
 Simon Stepaniak, NFL player
 Van Stephenson, musician
 John Cleves Symmes Jr., soldier, philosopher
 Pat Tabler, professional baseball player and broadcaster
 Jim Tracy, professional baseball player and manager
 Roger Troutman, singer, songwriter
 Scott Walker, musician, singer, member of the Walker Brothers
 Brad Warner, zen priest and author
 Andrew R. Wheeler, lawyer and Acting Administrator of the United States Environmental Protection Agency (EPA)
 Jane Delaplaine Wilson, author, daughter of Joshua Deleplane, one of the pioneer settlers of Ohio
 Jimmy Wynn, MLB player

Notes

References

Sources
 Jim Blount. The 1900s: 100 Years In the History of Butler County, Ohio. Hamilton, Ohio: Past Present Press, 2000.
 Butler County Engineer's Office. Butler County Official Transportation Map, 2003. Fairfield Township, Butler County, Ohio: The Office, 2003.
 "Butler County Transit", Cincinnati-Transit website

External links

 City website
 

 
Cities in Ohio
Cities in Butler County, Ohio
1791 establishments in the United States
Populated places established in 1791